Soho Mint was created by Matthew Boulton in 1788 in his Soho Manufactory in Handsworth, West Midlands, England. A mint was erected at the manufactory containing eight machines, to his own patent design, driven by steam engine, each capable of striking 70 to 85 coins per minute.

In addition to copper domestic coins, silver coins were made for some of the colonies, and various trade tokens and medals were struck. Among the medals produced were the Seringapatam medal, made for the East India Company in 1801–2 to reward participants of the Battle of Seringapatam, and a medal for the Battle of Trafalgar, which Matthew Boulton produced at his own expense and gave to all those present at the 1805 battle.

After the demise of the Soho Mint some of the machinery was bought at auction, in 1850, by the new Birmingham Mint of Ralph Heaton II.

Cartwheel penny
The common coinage, copper halfpennies, was subject to severe counterfeiting.
No copper coinage had been issued by the Royal Mint since 1754 apart from inadequate issues of halfpence  and farthings from 1770 to 1775.

In order to differentiate his proposed copper coins from counterfeits Boulton specified them as follows:
twopence weight, diameter 8 to the foot
penny, diameter 17 to two feet
half-penny, diameter 10 to a foot
farthing, diameter 12 to a foot 

Their weight in pure copper should be so close to the intrinsic value of the material that counterfeiting would be uneconomic. The diameter was made strictly defined by striking within a collar so that diameter, thickness and weight could be used to prove the quality of the metal.

In 1797 the first, and only, copper twopence and the first penny coins were produced under contract although the smaller denominations did not follow until later. These coins were comparatively large, having a broad raised rim with the inscription pressed below the surface and became known as the cartwheel pennies. Over 45 million were struck in two years. The new copper coins were issued at the Soho Mint and by Charlotte Matthews in London who was the banker and business advisor to Watt and Boulton.

See also
British halfpenny coin regarding counterfeit coinage
History of mints
History of the British penny (1714-1901)
Old Bess, a steam engine at the Mint

References

External links 

Britain's Cartwheel Coinage of 1797
On Matthew Bolton and the Soho mint
sohomint.info  A website celebrating Matthew Boulton, his mint and its products

1788 establishments in England
History of Birmingham, West Midlands
Mints of the United Kingdom
British companies established in 1788